Desert Guns is a 1936 American Western film directed by Charles Hutchison and starring Conway Tearle, Margaret Morris and William Gould.

Cast
 Conway Tearle as Kirk Allenby / Bob Enright
 Margaret Morris as Roberta Enrright
 William Gould as Jeff Bagley
 Budd Buster as Utah Carroll
 Kate Brinker as Cherry 
 Duke R. Lee as Steve Logan 
 Marie Werner as Mary Carroll
 Charles K. French as The Colonel 
 Pinkey Barnes as Hank Morgan 
 George Chesebro as Cowboy 
 Fred Church as Cal Jennings 
 Art Felix as Henchman Norton 
 Ray Gallagher as Deputy 
 Buck Morgan as Henchman Slocum
 Horace Murphy as Doctor Jeff D. Stanley
 Bill Patton as Sheriff Slade 
 Slim Whitaker as Henchman

References

Bibliography
 Pitts, Michael R. Western Movies: A Guide to 5,105 Feature Films. McFarland, 2012.

External links
 

1936 films
1936 Western (genre) films
American black-and-white films
American Western (genre) films
Films directed by Charles Hutchison
1930s English-language films
1930s American films